Shashilal K. Nair is an Indian film director and producer. He began his career as an assistant in films like Shankarbharanam, Sargam, and Kaam Chor. He made his directorial debut with the film Bahu Ki Awaaz in 1985. which was described by the Directorate of Film Festival as a "strong comment on bride burning and dowry", and since then has directed eight motion pictures, which include Karamdaata (1986), Parivaar (1987), Angaar (1992), One 2 Ka 4 (2001) and Ek Chhotisi Love Story (2002). For his special effects in Angaar, he received the National Film Award for Best Special Effects, for "his absolutely convincing miniature work in the film".

Filmography

Awards 
1993, National Film Award for Best Special Effects, Angaar

References

External links 
 

Hindi film producers
Hindi-language film directors
Living people
Year of birth missing (living people)
Best Special Effects National Film Award winners